Mount Kaliakouda is a mountain in the Evrytania regional unit, Central Greece. It has a height of 2,101 metres above sea level.

Kaliakouda is a south-eastern extension of the southern Pindus Mountains, and is located between the mountains of Vardousia, Tymfristos and Panaitoliko. A highway leads to the top of the mountain.

References

External links

Two-thousanders of Greece
Landforms of Evrytania
Mountains of Central Greece
Pindus